Anna Tkach (born 17 April 1975) is a retired Russian-born Israeli sprinter who specialized in the 400 metres.

Tkach is Jewish, and was a Russian citizen until 2003 when she changed nationality to Israel. She competed for her new country in the 400 metres at the 2003 World Championships, reaching the semi-final. She also competed in the 4 x 400 metres relay.

Her personal best times were 11.45 seconds in the 100 metres, achieved in June 1999 in Moscow; 23.07 seconds in the 200 metres, achieved in June 1999 in Moscow; and 50.67 seconds in the 400 metres, achieved in July 2000 in Tula. She also holds the current Israeli record in the 400 metres at 52.06.

See also
List of Israeli records in athletics
Sports in Israel

References

1975 births
Living people
Russian female sprinters
Israeli female sprinters
Russian emigrants to Israel
Russian Jews
Israeli Jews
Jewish female athletes (track and field)
Russian people of Israeli descent
Universiade medalists in athletics (track and field)
Universiade silver medalists for Russia